Kencho Khunrte Keute ( cobra to dig earthworms) is a 1995 Bengali film directed by Chiranjeet Chakraborty. The film's music director was Anupam Dutta and lyricist was Laxmikanta Roy. The film starred Chiranjeet Chakraborty and Indrani Dutta in the lead roles.

Cast
 Chiranjeet Chakraborty
 Indrani Dutta
 Utpal Dutta
 Satya Bandyopadhyay
 Basanti Chattopadhyay

Awards
BFJA Awards (1996):-
 Best Music:Anupam Dutta
 Best Playback Singer (Male):Kumar Sanu

References

External links
 Kencho Khunrte Keute at the Gomolo

Bengali-language Indian films
1995 films
1990s Bengali-language films
Films scored by Anupam Dutta